Below is a list of international trips made by Jarosław Kaczyński, the 13th Prime Minister of Poland. The number of visits per country where he travelled are:

 One visit to Portugal, Denmark, Netherlands, Ukraine, Germany, Italy, Vatican City, United States
 Two visits to Belgium, Lithuania, Iraq, Slovakia, Finland

2006

2007

References 

Foreign relations of Poland
State visits by Polish leaders
Kaczyński
Kaczyński